The British Society for Haematology is a registered charity founded in 1960 for professionals specialising in haematology, the medical specialism covering blood disorders including cancers. Apart from representing the interests of its members, it publishes the British Journal of Haematology and the open-access journal EJHaem, and issues guidelines on haematological conditions.

Membership
Full membership to the society is open to all but usually consists of senior haematology professionals, including consultants, senior lecturers, senior scientists and Allied Health Professionals at band 8b and above. Full membership also requires payment of an annual membership fee.

A reduced fee full membership is also available for established haematology professionals, including Specialty Trainees, Academic Clinical Fellows, residents of Low-and-Middle-Income Countries, Specialty Doctors, Post-doctoral researchers and scientists and Allied Health Professionals of bands 8a.

Associate membership is available for undergraduate and full-time post-graduate students, foundation doctors, core trainees, IM trainees, STP trainees, nurses and allied health professionals up to and including Band 7. It is also available for retired professionals that wish to access the British Journal of Haematology or vote in Society elections.

The British Journal of Haematology
The British Journal of Haematology (BJH) is the official journal of the British Society for Haematology. The BJH is a peer-reviewed medical journal that has been in publication since 1955. The Journal publishes original research papers in clinical, laboratory and experimental haematology, helping clinicians and staff in the field keep up to date with the latest recommendations, developments, and protocols.

EJHaem
The BSH has launched an open access journal, EJHaem, with Professor Andrew M Evens appointed as Editor-in-chief. This is the society's second official journal and is co-owned and published by Wiley. This Gold Open Access journal aims to provide an additional home for those wishing to publish haematology research on an Open Access basis. The EJHaem accepts direct submissions, as well as content cascaded from the British Journal of Haematology.

Guidelines
The British Society for Haematology produces its guidelines. These guidelines are written by expert consultants and clinical scientists currently practising in the UK. The guidelines provide up-to-date evidence-based guidance on the diagnosis and treatment of haematological diseases.

They provide three different styles of guidelines:

BSH Guideline: Evidence-based guidelines developed following a professional literature search and a review of the evidence by the writing group.

BSH Good Practice Paper:  Used to recommend good practice in areas where there is a less robust evidence base but for which a degree of consensus or uniformity is likely to be beneficial to patient care.

BSH Position Paper: The adoption and adaptation of a non-UK evidence-based guideline for use in the UK.

BSH Events

Annual Scientific Meeting

Every year the BSH holds an annual scientific meeting (ASM) at different locations within the United Kingdom. The 2019 ASM was held at the Scottish Event Campus in Glasgow. The meetings usually host internationally renowned expert speakers, a range of sessions discussing specialist topics, and innovative debates. In addition to this, there is a call for abstracts from haematology professionals in which they apply to present their research at the meeting.

Other Events

The BSH also frequently hosts a variety of courses and events. These courses and events are organized for special interest groups and trainee haematology students and professionals.  They permit the professional development of attendees and also provide a platform for discussion and networking opportunities.

BSH Grants

The BSH provides grants to support hundreds of haematology professionals to attend international conferences, undertake research and advance haematology education.  There are grants provided for members only – open to members after one year of membership.
These grants include meeting support grants, cohort study grants (open to members with three years of membership), early-stage research start-up grants and visiting fellow grants.

Other grants are open to all. These grants include Undergraduate support, ASM Travel Scholarships, and some Global Haematology Scholarships.

List of presidents

References

External links
 Official website
 EJHaem

Health in the London Borough of Islington
Hematology organizations
Medical associations based in the United Kingdom
Organisations based in the London Borough of Islington